Mount Atwood is a mountain,  high, at the west edge of the Clark Mountains in the Ford Ranges of Marie Byrd Land. It was discovered by the United States Antarctic Service (USAS) in 1940 on aerial flights from the West Base, and named by the USAS for the late president emeritus W.W. Atwood, Sr., of Clark University, noted geologist and geographer, and his son, W.W. Atwood, Jr., who collaborated with his father in glaciological studies.

References
 

Mountains of Marie Byrd Land